The Arsenal-Delanne 10 was an experimental fighter aircraft of French origin. The plane had a rear cockpit and a distinctive tandem wing.

Design and development
The Arsenal-Delanne 10-C2 two-seat fighter, designed by Maurice Delanne and built by the Arsenal de l'Aéronautique, was of so-called Nenadovich biplane or tandem wing configuration, the tandem-mounted wings providing a continuous slot effect and offering exceptional center of gravity range. The fighter was of all metal stressed-skin construction, which used a sandwich technique, with a smooth dural skin welded to a corrugated sheet. Pilot and gunner sat in tandem under a single canopy at the rear of the fuselage, which was level with the rear wing, which carried twin tailplanes. This arrangement gave the gunner a clear field of fire for his planned armament of two 7.5 mm machine guns, which was to be supplemented by a 20 mm cannon firing through the propeller hub and two more machine guns in the wing. The aircraft was fitted with a retractable tailwheel undercarriage and was powered by a single  Hispano-Suiza 12Ycrs 12-cylinder liquid-cooled engine.

The Arsenal-Delanne 10-C2 prototype was virtually complete at Villacoublay when German forces occupied the factory in June 1940. Work on the aircraft continued in a desultory fashion and the first flight test was made in October 1941. After completion of the initial test programme, the aircraft was ferried to Germany for further trials.

Specifications

See also
 Miles M.35 Libellula

Footnotes

Bibliography

External links
 Artist's impression in 1938 Flight
 Picture at histaviation.com

1940s French experimental aircraft
Aircraft first flown in 1941
Delanne 10
Single-engined tractor aircraft
Tandem-wing aircraft
Gull-wing aircraft